The Shire of Violet Town was a local government area about  northeast of Melbourne, the state capital of Victoria, Australia.

History

Violet Town was first incorporated as a shire on 11 April 1895, having previously been part of the Shire of Benalla and the Shire of Euroa.

On 18 November 1994, the Shire of Violet Town was abolished, and along with the Shires of Euroa, Goulburn and some neighbouring districts, was merged into the newly created Shire of Strathbogie. Caniambo and Tamleugh were transferred to the newly created City of Greater Shepparton, whilst the Warrenbayne district was merged into the newly created Shire of Delatite.

Ridings

The Shire of Violet Town was divided into three ridings, each of which elected three councillors:
 North Riding
 Central Riding
 South Riding

Towns and localities
 Boho South
 Caniambo
 Creek Junction
 Earlston
 Gowangardie
 Koonda
 Marraweeny
 Tamleugh
 Upotipotpon
 Violet Town*

* Council seat.

Population

* Estimate in the 1958 Victorian Year Book.

References

External links
 Victorian Places - Violet Town and Shire

Violet Town